Bartus A. Quinn (February 19, 1917 – March 3, 2013) was an American basketball player.  He was an All-American college player at the University of Toledo and played one season in the National Basketball League (NBL) of the United States, one of the major American leagues that later became the National Basketball Association.

Quinn, a 6'2", 200-pound forward from Fort Wayne, Indiana, went on to play for his hometown Fort Wayne General Electrics of the NBL directly out of high school.  In the 1937–38 season, he averaged 9.4 points per game and was named to the All-NBL Second Team.

After his season in the NBL, Quinn went to Toledo to play college basketball.  He was a three-year starter for the Rockets, finishing his career with 702 points.  As a senior in 1941–42, Quinn led the Rockets to the 1942 National Invitation Tournament.  He was named All-Ohio and a first-team All-American by Madison Square Garden.  Following his college career, he served in the United States Navy during World War II.

Quinn died on March 3, 2013, at the age of 96.

References

1917 births
2013 deaths
All-American college men's basketball players
American men's basketball players
Basketball players from Fort Wayne, Indiana
Fort Wayne General Electrics players
Forwards (basketball)
Toledo Rockets men's basketball players